Zhao Lei (died 220 A.D.), courtesy name Kansui (闞穗), was a military officer serving under the warlord Liu Bei in the late Eastern Han Dynasty.

Life
Zhao Lei was a controller (都督) under Guan Yu. In 220, Zhao Lei was captured by Sun Quan's general Ma Zhong after Lü Meng's invasion of Jing Province and executed along with Guan Yu and Guan Ping.

In fiction
In Chapter 73 of Luo Guanzhong's novel Romance of the Three Kingdoms, when Guan Yu was attacking Fancheng, Wang Fu recommended that Zhao Lei be left to defend Jingzhou, but Guan Yu instead appointed Zhao as a supply officer.

Later, when Guan was trapped in Maicheng, Zhao proposed a plan and followed Guan in an attempt to break out of the siege. They were ambushed by Sun Quan's forces and Zhao was killed in action.

See also
 Lists of people of the Three Kingdoms

References

 Chen, Shou (3rd century). Records of the Three Kingdoms (Sanguozhi).
 Luo, Guanzhong (14th century). Romance of the Three Kingdoms (Sanguo Yanyi).

Officials under Liu Bei
2nd-century births
3rd-century executions
220 deaths
Executed Han dynasty people
People executed by the Han dynasty by decapitation